Brette Tanner (born November 7, 1975) is an American basketball coach who is currently the head coach of the Abilene Christian Wildcats, a position he has held since 2021. He played collegiately at Emporia State from 1996 to 1998. Tanner served as an assistant coach at Stephen F. Austin. He was hired as an assistant coach at Abilene Christian in 2013, as the school transitioned to Division I.

Head coaching record

References

External links 
 Brette Tanner on Twitter
 Abilene Christian profile

1975 births
Living people
Abilene Christian Wildcats men's basketball coaches
Allen Red Devils men's basketball players
American men's basketball coaches
College men's basketball head coaches in the United States
Emporia State Hornets basketball players
Fort Scott Greyhounds men's basketball coaches
South Plains Texans basketball coaches
Stephen F. Austin Lumberjacks basketball coaches